Anthony Brian Palfreman (born 27 August 1946) is an English former first-class cricketer and cricket administrator.

Palfreman was born in the village of Ravenshead in Nottinghamshire. He was educated at Nottingham High School, before going up to Emmanuel College, Cambridge. While studying at Cambridge, Palfreman played first-class cricket as an all-rounder for Cambridge University in 1966–68, making sixteen appearances. As a batsman he scored 432 runs at an average of 15.42, with two half centuries and a high score of 67. As a right-arm fast-medium bowler, he took 31 wickets at a bowling average of 37.37, with one five wicket haul of 5 for 63 against Essex at Brentwood in 1966. In addition to playing cricket at Cambridge, he also played football for Cambridge University A.F.C., gaining a blue.

After graduating from Cambridge, Palfreman became a solicitor. He later served as the chairman of the Nottinghamshire Cricket Board.

References

External links

1946 births
Living people
People from Gedling (district)
Cricketers from Nottinghamshire
People educated at Nottingham High School
Alumni of Emmanuel College, Cambridge
English cricketers
Cambridge University cricketers
English solicitors
English cricket administrators